Operation High Roller was a series of fraud in the banking system in different parts of the world that used cyber-collection agents in order to collect PC and smart-phone information to electronically raid bank accounts. It was dissected in 2012 by McAfee and Guardian Analytics. A total of roughly $78 million was siphoned out of bank accounts due to this attack. The attackers were operating from servers in Russia, Albania and China to carry out electronic fund transfers.

Specifications
This cyber attack is described to have the following features:

 Bypassed Chip and PIN authentication.
 Required no human participation.
 Instruction came from cloud-based servers (rather than the hacker's PC) to further hide the identity of the attacker.
 Included elements of "insider levels of understanding".
 Banks in Europe, the United States and Colombia were targeted.
 Impacted several classes of financial institution such as credit unions, large global banks, regional banks, and high-net-worth individuals.

While some sources have suggested it to be an extension of man-in-the-browser attack Operation High Roller is reported to have harnessed a more extensive level of automation distinguishing it from the traditional methods.

See also

Bundestrojaner
Cyber-collection
Duqu
Flame
Guardian Analytics
McAfee
Stuxnet

References

External links
 Dissecting operation high roller on McAfee/Guardian Analytics report
 Operation high roller on CNN Money
 Operation high roller on Fox News report
 Operation high roller on Yahoo Finance
 Operation high roller revisited

Hacking (computer security)
Cyberwarfare
Hacker groups